Ryon Cristopher Healy (born January 10, 1992) is an American former professional baseball first baseman and third baseman. He previously played in Major League Baseball (MLB) for the Oakland Athletics, Seattle Mariners, and Milwaukee Brewers as well as for the Hanwha Eagles of the KBO League.

Amateur career
Healy attended Crespi Carmelite High School in Encino, California. Undrafted out of high school, Healy enrolled at the University of Oregon, where he played college baseball as a first baseman for the Oregon Ducks. As a junior, Healy set a Ducks single-season record with 56 runs batted in (RBIs), and a career record with 118 RBIs. In 2011, he played collegiate summer baseball with the Cotuit Kettleers of the Cape Cod Baseball League, and returned to the league in 2012 with an all-star season for the Brewster Whitecaps.

Professional career

Oakland Athletics
The Oakland Athletics selected Healy in the third round of the 2013 Major League Baseball draft. Healy signed with the Athletics.

In 2014, Healy played for the Stockton Ports of the Class A-Advanced California League, finishing the season with a .285 batting average, 16 home runs, and 83 RBIs. While playing for the Midland RockHounds of the Class AA Texas League in 2015, Healy was named an All-Star. He was also named Texas League Player of the Week twice.

Without an invite to big league camp, Healy returned to Midland to begin the 2016 season. However, Healy went on to hit .338 with 8 home runs and 34 RBI in 36 games before earning a promotion to the Nashville Sounds of the Class AAA Pacific Coast League. He appeared in the 2016 All-Star Futures Game as Oakland's lone representative, and earned an unlikely promotion to the major leagues on July 15. In 49 games with Nashville, Healy hit .318 with 6 home runs and 30 RBI, splitting time at first base and third base.

Upon his promotion, Healy was immediately inserted by manager Bob Melvin as the team's third baseman, supplanting Danny Valencia. He recorded his first major league hit, a 3-run home run, on July 16 in a game against the Toronto Blue Jays. On July 24, Healy hit a walk-off home run against the Tampa Bay Rays, capping a three-run ninth-inning rally. On October 3, Healy was named the AL Rookie of the Month for the month of September, when he hit .355 with 7 home runs and 19 RBI to conclude his breakout season. In 72 games, Healy hit .305/.337/.524 with 13 home runs and 37 RBI, with a batting average that led all qualified AL rookies, reaching as high as third in the batting order.

Coming off of an impressive 2016, Healy was expected to enter 2017 as Oakland's permanent third baseman. However, plans changed when the team signed Trevor Plouffe on January 10, 2017, and was named the starting third baseman by general manager David Forst on January 18. The move allowed Healy to move to his natural position at first base. In early 2017, he has split time between first base and designated hitter. He finished the season with a .271 average with 25 home runs and 78 runs batted in.

Seattle Mariners
On November 15, 2017, the Athletics traded Healy to the Seattle Mariners for Emilio Pagan and Alexander Campos. In his first season with the Mariners, Healy hit .235 with 24 home runs and 73 runs batted in. The following season, Healy suffered multiple injuries while shifting from playing first base to third base. He was declared out for the season on August 2, 2019 as he would undergo hip surgery. He was outrighted off of the Mariners roster on October 28.

Milwaukee Brewers
On December 17, 2019, Healy signed a one-year contract with the Milwaukee Brewers. On October 30, 2020, Healy was outrighted off of the 40-man roster. He elected free agency on November 3, 2020.

Hanwha Eagles
On December 5, 2020, Healy signed a one-year, $800K deal with the Hanwha Eagles of the KBO League. Healy played in 67 games with Hanwha in 2021, batting .257/.306/.394 with 7 home runs and 37 RBI. On July 4, 2021, Healy was released by the Eagles.

Tampa Bay Rays
On March 19, 2022, Healy signed a minor league contract with the Tampa Bay Rays. Healy was released by the Rays organization on March 31.

Retirement
On January 1, 2023, Healy announced his retirement from baseball via an Instagram post.

References

External links

1992 births
Living people
American expatriate baseball players in South Korea
Arizona League Athletics players
Arkansas Travelers players
Baseball players from Los Angeles
Brewster Whitecaps players
Cotuit Kettleers players
Hanwha Eagles players
Major League Baseball first basemen
Major League Baseball third basemen
Midland RockHounds players
Milwaukee Brewers players
Nashville Sounds players
Oakland Athletics players
Oregon Ducks baseball players
People from West Hills, Los Angeles
Seattle Mariners players
Stockton Ports players
Vermont Lake Monsters players